The Prodigal Son is a sculpture by Auguste Rodin.

Versions
Versions exist in several museums, including:
 Victoria and Albert Museum, London: c. 1885–1887, bronze
 Musée Rodin, Paris: 1905, bronze
 San Diego Museum of Art, Balboa Park, California: 1905, bronze
 Los Angeles County Museum of Art California: 1967, bronze

See also
List of sculptures by Auguste Rodin

References

External links
 

Bronze sculptures in California
Bronze sculptures in Paris
Bronze sculptures in London
Nude sculptures in France
Nude sculptures in the United Kingdom
Nude sculptures in California
Outdoor sculptures in San Diego
Sculptures of the San Diego Museum of Art
Sculptures by Auguste Rodin
Sculptures of men in California
Sculptures of men in France
Sculptures of men in the United Kingdom
Statues in San Diego
Statues in France
Statues in London